Bloodsuckers is a German comedy film written and directed by Julian Radlmaier. The film stars Alexandre Koberidze, Lilith Stangenberg, Alexander Herbst and Corinna Harfouch. It is a story of an actor who wants to try his luck in Hollywood and falls in love with a vampire. The story is a comedy revolving around a vampire, her lover and her clumsly servant .

The film has its worldwide premiere at the 71st Berlin International Film Festival in the Encounters section.

Cast
The cast include:
 Aleksandre Koberidze as Ljowushka
 Lilith Stangenberg as Octavia
 Alexander Herbst as Jakob
 Corinna Harfouch as Tante Erkentrud
 Daniel Hoesl
 Andreas Dohler as Dr. Humburg
 Marie Rathscheck
 Mareike Beykirch
 Anton Gonopolski as Sergei Eisenstein
 Martin Hansen as Franz

Awards
2021 Golden Unicorn Awards: Best Foreign Film with a Russian Connection award.
2021: Moscow International Film Festival, Special Jury Award (also nominated for Best Film) 
2019: German Screenplay Award

References

External links

2021 comedy films
2021 films
German comedy films
2020s German-language films
2020s German films